Cineplex Inc. (formerly Cineplex Galaxy) is a Canadian cinema and family entertainment centre chain headquartered in Toronto.

The company was formed in 2003 via the acquisition of Loews Cineplex's Canadian operations (which included the assets of the former Cineplex Odeon chain) by Onex Corporation and Oaktree Capital Management, and its subsequent merger with Onex's Galaxy Entertainment—a chain of cinemas that was established in 1999 by former Cineplex Odeon executives, and operated primarily in smaller markets. The company subsequently acquired Famous Players from National Amusements in 2005, went public in 2011, and acquired Empire Theatres' operations in Atlantic Canada and parts of Ontario in 2013. In December 2019, Cineplex agreed to be acquired by British exhibitor Cineworld Group for $2.8 billion, pending regulatory and shareholder approval, but Cineworld abandoned the sale in June 2020 due to unspecified breaches of the sale terms.

The company operates cinemas across Canada, primarily under the brand Cineplex Cinemas. Some flagship locations operate as Scotiabank Theatre, while some locations use brands carried over from its corporate predecessors (such as Famous Players, SilverCity, Odeon, and Galaxy, although some of them have since been converted to the Cineplex banner). The company also owns family entertainment centres under the brands the Rec Room and Playdium, the rewards loyalty program Scene+, the e-commerce Cineplex Store, film distributor Cineplex Pictures and the digital advertising business Cineplex Media.

History

1912–1998: Predecessors

Cineplex stakes a partial claim to the history of the Famous Players Film Company (later Paramount Pictures), founded in 1912 by Adolph Zukor, as Cineplex's earliest predecessor; however, that company did not have any operations in Canada until 1920, when it bought Nathan Nathanson's Paramount Theatre chain, which Nathanson had established four years earlier. Nathanson, the 5th richest person in the world, became the first president of the resulting entity, Famous Player Canadian Corporation. In 1923, Famous Players bought out rival Allen Theatres, acquiring many buildings in the process.

Odeon Theatres of Canada was established in 1941, before merging with the Canadian Theatres chain in 1978, becoming Canadian Odeon Theatres.

In 1979, Garth Drabinsky and Nat Taylor created the Cineplex Corporation and opened its first "Cineplex" theatre complex, in the Toronto Eaton Centre. Odeon merged with Cineplex in 1984 to form Cineplex Odeon Corporation, before being acquired by Loews Theatres in 1998, thereby becoming Loews Cineplex Entertainment.

1999–2005: Early years

Galaxy Entertainment Inc. was established in 1999 by Ellis Jacob, a former Chief Operating Officer of Loews Cineplex Entertainment, and Stephen Brown, a former Cineplex Chief Financial Officer. With investments from Onex Corporation and Famous Players, the new company focused on smaller markets that were usually served by smaller theatres and old equipment, opening large, major chain-style locations under the Galaxy Cinemas banner. By 2003, Galaxy Entertainment had grown to 19 theatres and $75 million in box office revenue.

In 2001, Loews Cineplex Entertainment (a 1998 merger of Universal Pictures' Cineplex Odeon and Sony's Loews Theatres) underwent bankruptcy due to the economic recession of the early 2000s. In June 2001, Onex Corporation announced its intent to acquire Loews Cineplex; as part of the deal, Loews Cineplex would close 46 cinemas (including 25 in Canada), and Onex would acquire the company for $1.3 billion with Oaktree Capital Management as a partner.

In November 2003, Loews Cineplex Entertainment's Canadian operations merged with Galaxy Entertainment as Cineplex Galaxy Income Fund. The U.S. operations of Loews Cineplex were divested in 2004 to several investors including The Carlyle Group.

2005–2013: Purchase of Famous Players, Cineplex Entertainment

On June 13, 2005, Cineplex Galaxy Income Fund announced its acquisition of Famous Players from Viacom for CA$500 million (about US$397 million). This deal was completed on July 22, 2005. To satisfy antitrust concerns, on August 22, 2005, the group announced the sale of 27 locations in Ontario and western Canada to Empire Theatres. On June 21, Loews Cineplex announced that it would merge with AMC Theatres. While AMC Theatres also operated in Canada and was ranked third behind Cineplex Galaxy and the enlarged Empire Theatres, Cineplex Odeon and AMC Theatres remained competitors.

In October 2005, Cineplex Galaxy changed the name of its operating subsidiary Cineplex Galaxy LP to Cineplex Entertainment LP, to reflect their expanded operations. On March 31, 2006, Cineplex sold seven more theatres in Quebec to Chelsea-based Fortune Cinemas. On June 29, 2007, Cineplex Entertainment announced its purchase of three Cinema City theatres in western Canada, consisting of two theatres in Winnipeg and one in Edmonton.

As Cineplex no longer held the rights to the branding, the Paramount Theatres locations were rebranded as Scotiabank Theatre as part of a joint venture with Scotiabank to launch a new loyalty program.

With the bankruptcy of Fortune Cinemas, Cineplex Entertainment acquired (or in this case, re-acquired) some of Fortune Cinemas theatres. The Starcité Gatineau (Starcité Hull) and the Cavendish theaters were reopened as Cineplex Entertainment theatres.

In June 2012, as part of its exit from the Canadian market, AMC sold four of its Canadian cinemas to Cineplex, including the Yonge Dundas 24 at 10 Dundas East (Cineplex's original location and namesake), and the Forum in Montreal. The company also earlier acquired the Tinseltown Movies 12 theatre from another American chain, Cinemark, in the Gastown neighbourhood of Vancouver.

Over the subsequent years, Cineplex expanded into advertising, events programming and a new concept, The Rec Room, amusement venues with live entertainment that serve food and drink.

2013–2018: Expansion, VIP Cinemas

In the 2010s, Cineplex began to deploy "VIP Cinemas" featuring reclining seats, in-seat meal services, and a licensed lounge. On August 15, 2014, Cineplex opened a dedicated VIP Cinemas Don Mills location, the first to be devoted solely to the format. By 2017, the company had also begun to retrofit selected non-VIP auditoriums to feature reclining seating.

On June 27, 2013, the Empire Company announced that it would divest its Empire Theatres operations in order to focus on its real-estate assets and grocery chain Sobeys. Cineplex acquired 24 former Empire locations in the Atlantic provinces as well as 2 in Ontario, for around $200 million (Landmark Cinemas acquired the remainder, predominantly in Western Canada and Ontario). In February 2014, Cineplex announced that it had acquired Empire's planned Lansdowne Park location in Ottawa, and would construct a new 10-screen cinema at the site with three VIP screens.

2019–present: Attempted acquisition by Cineworld 

On December 16, 2019, Cineplex announced a definitive agreement to be acquired by the British cinema operator Cineworld Group, the second-largest film exhibitor worldwide, pending shareholder and regulatory approval. Cineworld would be paying $34 per-share—a 42% premium over Cineplex's share price prior to the announcement, valuing the company at CDN$2.8 billion. Cineworld planned to pay US$1.65 billion, and to fund the remainder by taking on debt.

Combined with its ownership of the 564-location Regal Cinemas chain in the United States (which it had acquired the previous year), the sale would have made Cineworld the largest cinema chain in North America. Cineworld stated that it planned to integrate Cineplex's operations with those of Regal, while maintaining Cineplex's banners for its Canadian operations. The company also stated that it planned to reach $120 million in cost efficiencies and revenue synergies (including the adoption of a subscription service scheme similar to Regal and Cineworld) by the end of fiscal year 2020.

The sale was approved by Cineplex shareholders in February 2020. Activist shareholder Bluebell Capital Partners called for the Canadian government to block the sale due to the COVID-19 pandemic, which in turn led to the temporary closure of all Cineplex properties for several months starting on March 16. In May, Cineplex stated that Cineworld planned to complete the sale by June 2020, provided that it received federal approval under the Investment Canada Act, and that it met the terms of the sale agreement (including its debt not exceeding $725 million).

On June 12, 2020, Cineworld abandoned the purchase, alleging that Cineplex had engaged in conduct that breached unspecified terms of the sale, and that the company had experienced a "material adverse effect" of an unspecified nature. Cineplex denied the claims and made counter-allegations. The agreement with Cineworld included a condition that the latter would pay a penalty in case it decided to cancel the deal. In February 2021, CEO Ellis Jacob offered to temporarily convert Cineplex facilities into COVID-19 vaccination sites. In July, Cineplex started legal action against Cineworld claiming financial damages and Cineworld counter-sued.

In December 2021, the Ontario Superior Court of Justice ruled in favour of Cineplex, and ordered Cineworld to pay US$1 billion in damages for breach of contract. The company planned to appeal the ruling; Cineworld's shares fell by 40% in the immediate aftermath of the ruling. In September 2022, it was reported that the United States Bankruptcy Court for the Southern District of Texas had denied the appeal, amid Cineworld's Chapter 11 bankruptcy. It was also reported by The Wall Street Journal that Cineplex was exploring the possibility of a separate merger with Regal.

Operations

Theatre chains

Cineplex's flagship banners include Cineplex Cinemas ( in Quebec), with some older locations still using the previous "Cineplex Odeon" branding, and Scotiabank Theatre. Selected banners originating from Famous Players are still used by some locations, such as Famous Players and SilverCity ( in Quebec), but these banners, as well as others (such as Coliseum and Colossus) have been largely replaced by Cineplex Cinemas (although in the case of Coliseum and Colossus, the unique architectural features of these theatres have been preserved), and Scotiabank Theatre in the case of Famous Players' Paramount cinemas. The Galaxy Theatres brand is primarily used by small and medium-market locations, although some have since been converted to the Cineplex Cinemas banner.

Premium formats
Selected Cineplex locations offer including large-screen formats, motion seats, and VIP for a higher ticket price. Following the premiere of Star Wars: The Force Awakens in 2015, Cineplex reported that at least 80% of customers watched the film with one of its premium formats, and 40% of the company's overall box office revenue came from premium formats.

 Prime Seats are reserved seating rows in selected auditoriums, near the middle of the audience. They were first piloted in Ontario in 2014, before receiving a wider roll-out.
The company currently operates 24 digital IMAX screens. Only one of these, Cineplex Cinemas Markham and VIP, was built by Cineplex rather than acquired from another theatre chain. The screen size is from about 73 to 119 feet, depending on the venue. As of July 2017, five Cineplex locations offer IMAX 70 mm film playback: both Scotiabank Theatre locations in Alberta, plus the Langley location (former Colossus) in Metro Vancouver, and the Mississauga and Vaughan locations (former Coliseum and Colossus, respectively) in the Greater Toronto Area.
UltraAVX is Cineplex's in-house premium large format, referring to auditoriums with larger "wall-to-wall" screens and 4K projectors, Dolby Atmos surround sound, and reserved seating.
D-Box seats are available at selected locations, which offer motion effects synchronized with the film.
VIP Cinemas are a premium concept catering to adults; the screens feature a "VIP Lounge" area with a licensed bar, reserved seating, leather reclining seats with tables, and in-seat meal services offering snacks and other premium menu options. Access to VIP Cinemas are restricted by the legal drinking age; depending on local laws, some locations also allow consumption of alcoholic beverages inside the auditorium (otherwise only allowing them to be consumed in the VIP Lounge area). VIP Cinemas are offered at selected flagship locations, and Cineplex has also constructed several locations devoted exclusively to the format.
 4DX, a 4D film format, first launched at Cineplex Cinemas Yonge-Dundas on November 4, 2016. It debuted alongside the premiere of Doctor Strange as Canada's first cinema screen to feature the technology. 4DX includes stereoscopic 3D, as well as seat motion and other practical effects such as wind, strobes, and smell among others. A second 4DX screen opened at Scotiabank Theatre Chinook Centre Calgary in August 2019.
 Clubhouse is an auditorium concept designed primarily for children, featuring family films, multi-colored seats and a play structure.

Arcades and amusement

Xscape Entertainment Centre is the main arcade brand for Cineplex, featuring both redemption games and traditional games at all locations, along with a licensed lounge and party rooms at select locations. The brand was introduced in June 2009 at new and existing Cineplex locations, and expanded over time to 44 locations by the end of 2022. Xscape cards can store game credits and tickets, which can be redeemed at any location across Canada, and Xscape purchases are eligible for Scene+ rewards offers. In 2017, Cineplex began to expand the Xscape brand internationally, beginning with two standalone Xscape arcades at the Mall of America in Bloomington, Minnesota.

Several other Cineplex locations continue to feature a Cinescape arcade. In some cases, Cinescape replaces the TechTown and Zero Gravity brands deployed by Famous Players (in partnership with Playdium) and Galaxy respectively.

In January 2015, Cineplex announced The Rec Room, a entertainment restaurant chain similar to the U.S.-based chain Dave & Buster's. The Rec Room targets an adult demographic, and locations outside of Edmonton feature a curfew that prevents children and teens from visiting during late hours. The chain features restaurant and bar areas, recreational game areas, simulators, and an auditorium equipped with a cinema-style screen. Cineplex CEO Ellis Jacob explained that the chain is meant to help the company diversify beyond its core cinema business in the wake of the growing streaming industry, The first location opened in Edmonton, Alberta on September 19, 2016 at the South Edmonton Common. A second location in Toronto, Ontario at the Roundhouse Park opened in June 2017, followed by a third location at the West Edmonton Mall. The chain consists of 10 locations across Canada since the end of 2021.

Cineplex owns Playdium, an arcade and family entertainment centre chain focused on children and teens. The chain first launched in 1996 in Mississauga, Ontario. It expanded to four locations by June 1999, including Toronto, Edmonton and Burnaby. The Toronto location closed in 2002, and by the end of 2004, only the Mississauga location remained, which permanently closed on November 1, 2020. The chain was relaunched with two Ontario locations in 2019: Brampton on September 16, retrofitting the Cineplex Odeon Orion Gate theatre, and Whitby on November 4. A third Playdium location opened in Dartmouth, Nova Scotia on February 20, 2021. Cineplex aims to have 10 to 15 Playdium locations across Canada.

In November 2019, Cineplex Junxion was announced as a new cinema banner. These locations incorporate a traditional cinema, an Xscape arcade, and a restaurant area similar to The Rec Room. A similar concept exists at some SilverCity and Xscape combined locations. The first Cineplex Junxion opened at Kildonan Place in Winnipeg in 2022, with the Erin Mills Town Centre location in Mississauga slated to open in 2023.

Virtual reality

In November 2017, an IMAX VR centre opened at Scotiabank Theatre Toronto, as IMAX VR's first location in Canada. The following month, a D-Box VR experience launched at the Ottawa location. The IMAX VR centre closed in 2019, as part of the discontinuation of the IMAX VR pilot project.

In July 2018, after having opened such an attraction at The Rec Room at Roundhouse Park, Cineplex Entertainment announced that it had reached an agreement to be the exclusive Canadian franchisee of The Void — a chain of mixed reality entertainment attractions.

On September 13, 2018, Cineplex announced that it would acquire a stake in VRStudios—a Seattle-based provider of virtual reality installations, and utilize its equipment for as many as 40 VR centres across the country.

Scene+

Launched in 2007, Scene+ is an entertainment rewards program jointly owned by Scotiabank and Cineplex Entertainment.

Food and beverages
Cineplex has an Outtakes restaurant in many of its theatres, some which replace previous restaurant partners (Burger King, KFC Express, Pizza Pizza/Pizza 73, Pizza Hut Express, Taco Bell Express and New York Fries) and others which introduce restaurants at locations which did not previously feature one. VIP Cinemas and some Xscape locations feature a licensed lounge with more premium offerings compared to Outtakes.

Poptopia is a flavoured popcorn restaurant offered in a full-service format at 22 locations. Other Cineplex theatres may feature Poptopia at the concession stand, but only in the caramel corn and/or kettle corn flavours.

Ice cream at Cineplex locations debuted with Baskin-Robbins and TCBY. Beginning in December 2007, Yogen Früz became the preferred partner. On January 1, 2014, Cineplex acquired a 50% stake in Yoyo's Yogurt Café. As of January 2017, 77 Cineplex theatres feature Yoyo's restaurants, while Yogen Fruz is still available in 23 Cineplex theatres while TCBY is available in 16 locations. Cineplex also manages Melt Sweet Creations, an in-house dessert boutique brand targeted at women ages 19–35 debuted in December 2017 at Cineplex Cinemas Queensway and VIP. Melt is available at 13 locations.

Beverages are available in both cold and hot formats. Cold beverages include the Coca-Cola lineup, which replaced the Pepsi lineup used at locations formerly owned by Famous Players. 12 locations feature Coca-Cola Freestyle. Hot beverages include Starbucks as the incumbent provider with 105 locations, all which offer Pike Place Roast coffee (regular or decaf) and Tazo tea. Select locations also offer premium drinks such as caffè mocha or caramel macchiato. Tim Hortons is available as a full-service restaurant in five locations, with Brossard being the only location to offer both Tim Hortons and Starbucks.

In most theatres, Cineplex offers sale of alcohol to 19+ guests in Ontario (18+ in Alberta) similar to the VIP theatres albeit from a selection of beer or cider beverages.

Corporate governance

The current Chief Executive Officer and President of Cineplex Entertainment is Ellis Jacob. Alongside with Jacob are Jordan Banks who serves as a Facebook executive, Robert Bruce, Joan Dea, Ian Greenberg, the founder of Astral Media, Sarabjit S. Marwah, Anthony Munk, Edward Sonshine, Christopher Medlock, Robert J. Steacy and Phyllis Yaffe, who serves as its chair.

Criticism and controversy 
The Motley Fool described Cineplex as having a "virtual monopoly" over the cinema market in Canada.

In 2012, a class-action lawsuit was filed against Cineplex over locations refusing to honour the company's "Cheap Tuesdays" promotion. The company agreed to a $7,000 settlement, including a $25,000 charitable donation.

In 2019, the producers of Unplanned, an anti-abortion-themed film, criticized Cineplex for initially declining to pick up the film after securing a Canadian distributor. They felt it amounted to an effective "ban" of the film from Canada due to the company's scale. The film's co-director Cory Solomon also, along with other pro-life supporters and religious groups, called for a boycott of Cineplex. The company later announced that it would—joining competitor Landmark Cinemas and a handful of independent cinemas—screen Unplanned with a one-week limited release at 24 Cineplex locations. The decision was praised by pro-life supporters, but did lead to criticism from pro-choice groups due to disputes over the film's content (with the Alberta Pro-Choice Coalition stating that it planned to hold a peaceful protest outside Scotiabank Theatre Chinook Centre). The film itself had already attracted criticism from groups, such as the Abortion Rights Coalition of Canada, over its factual accuracy, with the Coalition describing it as "American propaganda".

During the 2019 Toronto International Film Festival, festival organizers stated that Cineplex would no longer allow films distributed by an online video service (such as Amazon Video or Netflix) to be screened at the Scotiabank Theatre Toronto (which has been considered the "primary" venue of the event for major screenings) due to company policy, as the services do not adhere to industry-standard theatrical windows. ScreenDaily stated that this was "believed to be the first time an exhibitor’s position on theatrical windowing has affected scheduling at a major film festival".

See also
List of Cineplex Entertainment movie theatres
Landmark Cinemas - second largest movie theatre chain in Canada

Notes

References

External links

 
 Cineplex Creative

 
Companies listed on the Toronto Stock Exchange
Canadian companies established in 1999
Entertainment companies established in 1999
Companies based in Toronto
Movie theatre chains in Canada
Canadian brands
Universal Windows Platform apps
Entertainment companies of Canada
1999 establishments in Ontario